La Opinión de Tenerife is a newspaper of the province of Santa Cruz de Tenerife (Canary Islands, Spain).

History and profile
La Opinión de Tenerife was launched online on 11 September 1999 and distributed in print kiosks just ten days later, on 21 September 1999. It has its editorial and administrative offices in Santa Cruz de Tenerife and is printed in the workshops of San Cristóbal de La Laguna.

It was one of the first newspaper to be directed by a woman, Carmen Ruano.

References

External links
 

1999 establishments in Spain
Mass media in Santa Cruz de Tenerife
Daily newspapers published in Spain
Publications established in 1999
Spanish-language newspapers